During the 2002–03 Italian football season, Como Calcio competed in the Serie A.

Season summary
Como Calcio finished the season in 17th position in the Serie A table and they relegated back to Serie B. In other competitions, Como reached the second round of the Coppa Italia.

Nicola Amoruso and Fabio Pecchia was the top scorer for Como with 6 goals in all competitions.

Squad

Goalkeepers 
  Alex Brunner
  Fabrizio Ferron
  Stefano Layeni

Defenders 
  Daniele Gregori
  Niccolo Guzzo
  Juárez de Souza Teixeira
  Pasquale Padalino
  Cristian Stellini
  Massimo Tarantino
  Stjepan Tomas

Midfielders 
  Riccardo Allegreti
  Mirko Benin
  Jonatan Binotto
  Benoît Cauet
  Nicola Corrent
  Vedin Musić
  Fabio Pecchia
  Marco Rossi

Attackers 
  Nicola Amoruso
  Luigi Anaclerio
  Nicola Caccia
  Benito Carbone
  Jorge Horacio Serna

Serie A

References 

Como
Como 1907 seasons